The 2000 House elections in Missouri occurred on November 3, 2000 to elect the members of the State of Missouri's delegation to the United States House of Representatives. Missouri had nine seats in the House, apportioned according to the 1990 United States Census.

These elections were held concurrently with the United States Senate elections of 2000 (including an election in Missouri where Democrat Mel Carnahan was posthumously elected to the United States Senate), the United States House elections in other states, and various state and local elections.

In addition to the races for U.S. Senate, Governor, and Missouri's electoral votes for President, the House contest in the Show-Me state's sixth congressional district was also among the nation's most competitive races in 2000.

Overview

2000 Missouri House elections

References

2000
Missouri
2000 Missouri elections